The 2013 Liqui Moly Bathurst 12 Hour was an endurance race for a variety of GT and touring car classes, including: GT3 cars, GT4 cars, Group 3E Series Production Cars and Dubai 24 Hour cars. The event, which was staged at the Mount Panorama Circuit, near Bathurst, New South Wales, Australia, on 10 February 2013, was the eleventh running of the Bathurst 12 Hour. The race also incorporated the opening round of the 2013 Australian GT Championship. The Australian GT Championship was to compete as the first hour only and cars were permitted to enter for only that hour or to cross-enter for both the first hour and continue for the endurance race.

There were 53 starters in the race, the largest field since the Bathurst 12 Hour event moved to GT orientation in 2011.

Class structure

Cars competed in the following six classes.
 Class A – GT3 Outright
 Class B – GT3 Cup Cars
 Class C – GT4
 Class D – Production (High Performance)
 Class E – Production (Performance)
 Class I1 – Invitational (under 3000cc)
 Class I2 – Invitational (between 3001cc & 4000cc)
 Class I3 – Invitational (over 4000cc)

Classes D & E were open to Group 3E Series Production Cars and Class I was for cars complying with the regulations for the 2013 Dubai 24 Hour race. There was also a provision for teams competing in the Australian GT Championship to race for the first 55 minutes of the race only, to compete for GT Championship points.

Qualifying
Two qualifying sessions were run on Saturday 9 February with Danish driver Allan Simonsen setting the fastest time of 2:05.49 in the Maranello Motorsport entered Ferrari 458 GT3. However, as penalties are applied for lap times recorded under 2:06 minutes to provide a form of parity, the car lost the lap time and acquired a 50 kg penalty.

Race
Driving a Mercedes-Benz SLS AMG for Erebus Motorsport, Germans Thomas Jäger, Alexander Roloff and former Formula One driver Bernd Schneider were the winners, covering 268 laps. The Ferrari 458 GT3 of Craig Baird, Matt Griffin and Weng Sun Mok finished a lap behind in second, with Griffin setting the fastest lap of the race with a lap of 2:06.8714. Finishing in third place was the VIP Petfoods Porsche 997 GT3-R of Matt Kingsley, Klark Quinn and Shane van Gisbergen.

A late afternoon rain storm caused havoc in the field as it started suddenly and most cars took a few laps to pit for wet weather tyres. Shane van Gisbergen, driving the Quinn Porsche, excelled in the wet conditions, passing several drivers across the top of the circuit despite the conditions. There were a number of safety cars in the wet conditions which caused the leaders to close up, with slower, lapped cars mixed in between. At one restart the #63 Erebus Motorsport SLS, which had been in contention for most of the race, clipped the #60 Lotus Elise and damaged the steering. The car was repaired but lost multiple laps, eventually finishing in sixth place.

Early in the day the two Aston Martins, Tony Quinn's DBRS9 in GT3 Class A, and the St Gallen Vantage GT4 of Baenziger, Kamelger and Porritt in Class C, had a coming together at the top of Conrod Straight. Quinn's race was ended and the Vantage GT4 recommenced racing, albeit many laps down. The #22 FPV FG GT of Robinson Racing Developments broke a supercharger pulley late in the day. The car was repaired using a part taken off a road car belonging to a crowd member, allowing the team to finish the race. The car recommenced racing in the last five laps and the team returned the borrowed part following the end of the race.

Official result

 – Tony Quinn was unable to drive in the race following a crash during the first hour of the race. He was replaced by Matt Kingsley.

 Note: Class winners are shown in Bold
 Race time of winning car: 12:03:4.5192
 Fastest race lap: 2:06.8714 – Matt Griffin

References

External links
 Official website

Motorsport in Bathurst, New South Wales
Liqui Moly Bathurst 12 Hour